Mónica García Gómez (born 16 January 1974) is a Spanish anesthesiologist and politician, current coordinator and spokesperson of the political party Más Madrid in the Madrilenian Assembly. She was an elected deputy during the X legislature of the Madrilenian Assembly under the Spanish political party Podemos, and is currently a deputy in the XI legislature as part of Más Madrid. Since 2015, García has combined her political work with her job in health care, with a 50% reduction in working hours.

Biography 
Born on 16 January 1974 in Madrid, she got a licentiate degree in Medicine and Surgery from the Universidad Complutense de Madrid (UCM), becoming a specialist in anesthesiology; García, who has developed her professional career as an anesthetist at Hospital 12 de Octubre in Madrid, took part as a spokesperson for the Association of Specialists of Madrid (AFEM) in the so-called mareas blancas ("white tides"), protests in defense of public health services.

Included as candidate number 26 on the Podemos list for the 2015 Madrid Assembly election led by José Manuel López, she was elected deputy of the 10th term of the regional legislature, joining the Parliamentary Group of Podemos Community of Madrid. At that time, she narrowly entered the Assembly (26th out of 27 elected legislators of Podemos); she conditioned the assumption of the seat to being able to continue exercising her medical profession part-time. In December 2017, by virtue of a reshuffle of the parliamentary group, García became the president of the parliamentary group replacing Marco Candela. At that time, she also joined the Coordination Council of Podemos Comunidad de Madrid.

Ascribed to the Podemos' faction led by Íñigo Errejón, she joined the latter's list for the Más Madrid primaries in order to draw up the list for the 2019 Madrilenian regional elections in March 2019, and thus she renewed her seat at the May 2019 regional election.

On 10 July 2020, the membership of Más Madrid endorsed Mónica García's list to coordinate the executive board of Más Madrid, with Pablo Gómez Perpinyà and Manuela Bergerot as additional co-coordinators, effectively becoming the visible head of the party in the Assembly of Madrid.

First announced as Más Madrid candidate for the motion of no confidence against regional President Isabel Díaz Ayuso, following the ruling of the Madrid's Higher Court of Justice which rejected both her party's motion of no confidence and that of the PSOE and therefore the validity of the electoral advance after the breakdown of the government of the region, she was announced as the candidate of her party for these elections. She refused to form a pact with Unidas Podemos and its lead candidate, former deputy prime minister Pablo Iglesias, saying "we women are tired of doing the dirty work for them to ask us to step aside at historic moments".

She became the leader of the opposition in the Assembly of Madrid following the 2021 Madrilenian regional elections and the investiture of Isabel Díaz Ayuso as President of the Community of Madrid.

COVID-19 pandemic 
As a doctor, she was at the frontline during the COVID-19 pandemic in Spain, working at her hospital treating coronavirus patients in the intensive care unit (UCI). She has starred the main clashes with the regional government in what is her second term. She asked the central government to intervene in Madrid in October following the new rise of cases, and her interventions in the Madrid Assembly receive great media coverage for her harshness against the government of the region.

Personal life 

García is married and has three children.

Electoral history

References 

Living people
1974 births
Más Madrid politicians
Spanish anesthesiologists
Members of the 10th Assembly of Madrid
Members of the 11th Assembly of Madrid
Members of the 12th Assembly of Madrid
Women anesthesiologists
21st-century women physicians
21st-century Spanish physicians
Spanish women physicians